Paul Natali (13 November 1933 – 31 March 2020) was a French politician.

Biography
An entrepreneur, Natali was President of CCI Bastia. He served as General Councillor for the Canton of Borgo, and as a Senator for Haute-Corse. He died on 31 March 2020 at the age of 86.

References

1933 births
2020 deaths